Alena and Ninel Karpovich (born on 3 March 1985 in Minsk, Byelorussian SSR, USSR) are a Belarusian twin sister musical duo that are current members of the  pop group 3+2 that represented Belarus in the Eurovision Song Contest 2010 in Oslo.  They have both hosted the Belarusian national lottery show together for a year. The twins have also release a few music singles as a musical duo.  They were finalists in the television talent show New Voices of Belarus equal to Star Factory and got work in the main state orchestra of Belarus. During the television show TV project Musical Court the twins became two of the members of the pop group 3+2 that will represent Belarus in the Eurovision on 25 May 2010. The sisters also had their own entry in the Belarus pre-selection heats that was held previously.

References

1985 births
Belarusian pop singers
Living people
Musicians from Minsk
Sibling musical duos
Belarusian twins
Eurovision Song Contest entrants of 2010
Eurovision Song Contest entrants for Belarus